The Men's 100 metre butterfly event at the 2010 Commonwealth Games took place on 7 and 8 October 2010, at the SPM Swimming Pool Complex. Ryan Pini of Papua New Guinea was the defending champion, and was in Delhi to defend his title, appearing as one of his country's best hopes for a medal.

Five heats were held, with most containing the maximum number of swimmers (eight). The top sixteen advanced to the semifinals and the top eight from there qualified for the finals.

Records
Prior to this competition, the existing world and Commonwealth Games records were as follows.

The following records were established during the competition:

Results

Heats
The heats began at 8:30am.

Semifinals
The semifinals began at 5:14 pm.

Final
The final took place on 8 October at 4:00 pm.

References

Aquatics at the 2010 Commonwealth Games
Men's 100 metre butterfly